Miralago is a village in the Val Poschiavo in the canton of Graubünden, Switzerland.

Miralago railway station, on the Bernina railway line, and the Kapelle San Gottardo, built between 1682 and 1694, lie within the village. The village is actually bisected by the boundary between the municipalities of Poschiavo and Brusio, with the railway station and most of the houses in Poschiavo, but the church and some houses in Brusio.

References

Poschiavo